Bestival 2006 was the third annual Bestival organised by the Rob da Bank's Sunday Best label. It was held at Robin Hill Country Park on the Isle of Wight from 8 to 10 September. Around 17,000 people attended the three-day event. The Bestival is often referred to as a "mini-Glastonbury" with regards to the excellent atmosphere the festival generates.

Bestival 2006 had a distinct sense of environmental and social consciousness. Indeed, the Bestival is one of the most ethically aware of the UK popular music festivals. This is reflected in the eclectic crowd it attracts and the vast array of fancy dress displayed at the 2006 event, including a Jimi Hendrix complete with guitar and amplifier, as well as a Viking Longboat with crew.

Bestival 2006 won Best Medium to Large Festival at the UK Festival Awards.

There were fourteen musical venues at the Bestival 2006. These were - 
Main Stage, The Big Top, The New Bollywood Bar, The Blue Pavilion, Southern Comfort Fat Tuesday, Rock 'n' Roll Tent, Come Dancing, Hidden Disco, Bandstand, Sense 3D Area, Xbox Lost and Sound, The Guardian Lounge, Loose Tea Tent, Studio 3.

An album was released containing various Bestival tracks since its inauguration in 2004. The Bestival Bugle was a 2006 single sheet newsreel distributed every day throughout the festival, containing Bestival information, tips and comic features. Bestival Radio (87.7 FM) was also established in order to give Bestival goers a live tab on action of the event.

2006 Festival
Triumphantly dubbed by organisers Sunday Best as, 'the festival of the year (because Glastonbury was not on this year)', this is a typical quote which encapsulates the ambition and humour that both organisers and festival goers give to the annual Bestival. However the claim had a greater foundation than most would imagine as a crowd of 15,000 were treated to a 3-day frenzy of Boutique festival madness which has quite rightly been dubbed the mini-Glastonbury.

Some of the most notable performances were produced by the Scissor Sisters, The Stranglers, Gogol Bordello, FAT Samba and Youngblood Brass Band.

The Scissor Sisters widely recognised as the best act of the weekend were inspirational using dry ice, strobe lighting, paper streamers and shooting various stage items onto the crowd to impress the crowd into submission. Witty conversation, Fantastic showmanship and a euphoric audience reception were some of the ingredients of the dish of the day.

The Stranglers drew upon their back catalogue and a large audience all singing to the tunes of Golden Brown and Peaches amongst others. Fat Samba drew on a large, excited crowd as they lead the fancy dress parade, tight drumming and eccentric costumes helped to win over the crowd. Gogol Bordello were an unknown quantity initially but after their set it became clear they were an eccentric, innovative and colossal quantity of music talent, lead singer Eugene Hutz was particularly entertaining, reminiscent of Freddie Mercury on stage. Youngblood Brass Band dazed the crowd with their no nonsense, get on stage and perform attitude. The unusual miz of trombones, trumpets, drummers, a tuba player and a rapper/snare drummer, the band performed an energetic set got the crowd jumping and dancing.

Clown controversy 

Following on from 2005's dressing attempt, the organisers of the festival decided to make this year's theme the circus and to have everyone dressed as clowns. On 8 July 2006, it was announced that this had been scrapped as festival-goers asked for refunds as they were scared of clowns.

The Scissor Sisters opened their set dressed in clown costumes, singer Ana Matronic joking "Sorry guys, we didn't get the memo."

Line Up

Main Stage

Friday
 Gogol Bordello
 Mystery Jets
 Mark Ronson
 The Fall
 Cagedbaby
 The Sunshine Underground
 Barry Peters Halifax Hospital Radio
 James Yorkston and The Athletes

Saturday
 Pet Shop Boys
 Guillemots
 Rachid Tara Ban with Brian Eno
 Kid Creole & The Coconuts
 The Cuban Brothers
 Lily Allen
 Man-Machine
 Kanda Bongo Man
 John Martyn
 Kitty Daisy & Lewis
 King Creosote

Sunday
 Scissor Sisters
 Amadou & Mariam
 Devendra Banhart
 Hot Chip
 The Stranglers
 The Young Knives
 Tunng
 The Hat
 The Aliens
 Jegsy Dodd

Other Stages

Friday
 Get Cape. Wear Cape. Fly
 Klaxons
 Annie Mac
 DJ Yoda
 Scritti Politti
 iLiKETRAiNS

Saturday
 Nizlopi
 The Pipettes

Sunday
 Planet Pendulum
 Jim Noir
 Rob da Bank

References

External links 
Bestival Website
eFestivals Bestival Page
Full Bestival Line Up

Music festivals on the Isle of Wight
2006 in British music
2006 in England